The crest is a prominent feature exhibited by several bird and other dinosaur species on their heads. It is distinct from features such as casques and cockscombs - sometimes erroneously referred to as "crests", which are bony and fleshy structures respectively.

The crest is made up of semiplume feathers: a long rachis with barbs on either side. These are plumulaceous feathers, meaning that they are soft and bendable. In birds, these semiplumes are common along the head, neck, and upper back, and may be used for buoyancy and sensing vibrations.

Crests on birds are generally used for display purposes. Cockatoos and their smaller cousins, cockatiels, are part of the parrot family Cacatuidae found in Australia, the Bismarck Archipelago and the Philippines, and are probably the most recognizable birds to feature crests.  Cockatoos and cockatiels possess crests which may be raised or lowered at will. Their crests are used to communicate with fellow members of their species, or as a form of defense to frighten away other species that approach too closely, making the bird appear larger when the crest is suddenly and unexpectedly raised.  Crests can be recumbent or recursive, depending on the species. The recumbent crest has feathers that are straight and lie down essentially flat on the head until the bird fans them out to where they stand up. The white cockatoo, for example, possesses a recumbent crest.  The recursive crest is noticeable even when it is not fanned out because it features feathers, that, when lying down, curve upward at the tips, and when standing up, often bend slightly forward toward the front of the head.  Many recursive crests also feature brilliant colors.  The sulphur-crested cockatoo has a recursive crest, and the Major Mitchell's cockatoo (also known as the Leadbeater's cockatoo) possesses a prominent recursive crest.  Some birds, like the galah, or rose-breasted cockatoo, have modified crests, which has features of both recumbent and recursive types.

Many domesticated bird species have crest feathers. These structures are known to have two origins: selective breeding or mutations. Crest feathers in domestic birds include a wide range of variations in form across species. The underlying molecular and genetic mechanisms that are responsible for crest feather formation in domesticated bird species are not well understood. As such, crest feathers are widely studied in morphological research and other related biological disciplines, particularly concerning domesticated species.

Gallery

From winter to summer

See also
 Comb (anatomy)
 Crested penguin
 Snood (anatomy)
 Wattle (anatomy)

References

Feathers